Agata Strausa (born 2 December 1989) is a Latvian long-distance runner. In 2019, she competed in the senior women's race at the 2019 IAAF World Cross Country Championships held in Aarhus, Denmark. She finished in 105th place.

References

External links 
 

Living people
1989 births
Place of birth missing (living people)
Latvian female long-distance runners
Latvian female cross country runners